The Bootleg Series Vol. 14: More Blood, More Tracks is a compilation album by American singer-songwriter Bob Dylan. The 12th installment in the ongoing Bob Dylan Bootleg Series, it was released by Legacy Records on November 2, 2018. The compilation focuses on recordings Dylan made in September and December 1974 for his 1975 album Blood on the Tracks. The release comes in both a one disc standard edition and a six disc deluxe edition. It is the first volume since the third where the standard edition is not a double disc.

Prior to the appearance of this set, seven outtakes from the sessions for Blood on the Tracks had been officially released by Columbia: two appeared on Biograph; three appeared on Volume 2 of the Bootleg Series; one on Volume 3; and one as the b-side to the "Duquesne Whistle" single. An eighth appeared in altered form on the soundtrack album to the film Jerry Maguire, released on Sony Legacy, the parent company of Columbia. On September 20, 2018, in conjunction with the announcement of the compilation, Dylan released an alternate take of the song "If You See Her, Say Hello". The day before the limited edition six-disc set shipped, a note appeared on Bob Dylan's official website reporting that a printing error had occurred that resulted in four pages being omitted from the booklet accompanying the set. The website apologized for the omission and provided a PDF download of the missing pages.

Track listing

2-LP edition

Six-disc deluxe edition

Sampler version
A sampler version of the album was also released in 2018. It contains a slightly different track listing than the single-CD version, culling songs from the expanded six-CD version. It is also the only version currently used by streaming services.

Charts

References 

2018 compilation albums
Bob Dylan compilation albums
Columbia Records compilation albums
Demo albums